Globo Now is a subsidiary of Globo, a Brazilian television network. It produces and distributes programming from Brazil in Portugal and Europe.

In Portugal, it distributes three channels, two of which are premium channels. Since 1998 and prior to this establishment, Globo aired GNT Portugal and Canal Brasil in Portugal, which are currently unavailable. Despite GNT was one of the most watched channels in Portugal, it stopped being aired in Portugal in 2006 when the contract expired and Brazilian rival network Rede Record moved in. It soon returned to Portugal, with a premium channel branded as TV Globo Portugal in 2007, currently renamed Globo Premium. In October 17, 2011, the Rede Globo subsidiary was inaugurated in Lisbon.

Channels
Globo (general entertainment, HD version available)
PFC (Brazilian football channel, premium channel across platforms)
Globo Europa
Globo Africa (currently exclusive to ZAP in Angola and Mozambique, HD version available)
Globo ON (old content, exclusive to ZAP in Angola and Mozambique)

References

Grupo Globo subsidiaries
 

2 srmanad